Zijderveld is a surname. Notable people with the surname include: 

Chantalle Zijderveld (born 2000), Dutch swimmer
Willem Zijderveld (1796–1840), Dutch painter

Dutch-language surnames